The Instituto Nacional de Bellas Artes y Literatura (INBAL), located in the Palacio de Bellas Artes in Mexico City, is the Mexican institution in charge of coordinating artistic and cultural activities (both at the political and the educational level) in the country.

On November 23, 1946, president Miguel Alemán Valdés proposed the creation of the INBA, and it was formally opened on 1 January 1947, as a branch of the Secretaría de Educación Pública (SEP). The first head of the INBA was Carlos Chávez, who created a new orchestra for the Conservatory, the current Orquesta Sinfónica Nacional.

The institute includes many departments, artistic ensembles, three national centers for storage of the literary stock, 29 schools and further institutions. The school of design and handicrafts was founded by José Chávez Morado in 1962.

One of the important services the institute provides for the nation is to protect, along with the Instituto Nacional de Antropología e Historia, monuments and buildings deemed cultural patrimony. INAH is entrusted with 'archaeological' (pre-Hispanic and paleontological) and 'historical' (post-Conquest 16th to 19th centuries) structures, zones and remnants, while INBAL is entrusted with 'artistic' buildings and monuments (properties that are of significant aesthetic value). The valuation of aesthetic value is left to the Comisión Nacional de Zonas y Monumentos Artísticos (National Commission of Artistic Zones and Monuments). This commission is composed of the Director of INBAL, a representative of the Secretaría de Desarrollo Urbano y Ecología, a representative of UNAM, and three individuals affiliated with the arts picked by the Director. Edifices deemed worthy by the commission are catalogued in the Registro Público de Monumentos y Zonas Artísticos (Public Register of Artistic Monuments and Zones).

The institute provides education from elementary school through to postgraduate level; one of the educational institutions that INBAL manages is CEDARTS (centros de educación artística or artistic education centers, in English) which is focused on artistic education.

There are 12 CEDARTS in Mexico, three in Mexico City and the rest in some other states.
     
CEDART "Alfonso Reyes" Monterrey, Nuevo León
CEDART "David Alfaro Siqueiros" Chihuahua, Chihuahua
CEDART "Diego Rivera" Ciudad de México, CDMX
CEDART "Emilio Abreu Gómez" Mérida, Yucatán
CEDART "Frida Kahlo" Ciudad de México, CDMX
CEDART "Ignacio Mariano de las Casas" Querétaro, Querétaro
CEDART "José Clemente Orozco" Guadalajara, Jalisco
CEDART "José Eduardo Pierson" Hermosillo, Sonora
CEDART "Juan Rulfo" Colima, Colima
CEDART "Luis Spota Saavedra" Ciudad de México, CDMX
CEDART "Miguel Bernal Jiménez" Morelia, Michoacán
CEDART "Miguel Cabrera" Oaxaca, Oaxaca

In addition to the educational offerings, there are museums, galleries and buildings under the INBAL management, that the institute often uses to present different types of artistic entertainment to the general public, such as "tempestad" or a season of flamenco dance.

History

References

External links
  Official INBAL—Instituto Nacional de Bellas Artes y Literatura website—

Arts organizations based in Mexico
Instituto Nacional De Bellas Artes Y Literatura
Education in Mexico City
Mexican literature
Organizations based in Mexico City
1946 establishments in Mexico
Arts organizations established in 1946
Educational institutions established in 1946
Heritage registers in Mexico